General Sir Alexander Low  (June 1817 – 9 July 1904) was a British Army officer.

Military career
Low was commissioned as a cornet in the 4th Light Dragoons in October 1835. He was present at the Battle of Alma in September 1854 and commanded a squadron of the 4th Light Dragoons during the disastrous Charge of the Light Brigade at the Battle of Balaclava in October 1854 during the Crimean War. Lieutenant Henry Adlington reported that Low exhibited during the charge:

Low went on to command his regiment at the Battle of Inkerman in November 1854, the Battle of Eupatoria in  February 1855 and the Battle of the Chernaya in August 1855 as well as the closing stages of the Siege of Sevastopol later that year. He was promoted to major-general in 1868, lieutenant-general in 1874 and full general in 1880. He was appointed a Knight Commander of the Order of the Bath on 21 June 1904, just a few weeks before his death on 9 July 1904.

References

|-

British Army generals
1817 births
1904 deaths
Knights Commander of the Order of the Bath